Social networking pedagogy is a philosophy of education described by curriculum theorists Thomas Patrick Huston and Hallie DeCatherine Jones as a form of learner-driven participatory culture where the user's experience is reciprocal, consisting of a range of input and output experiences mediated by social networking technologies. The range of individual and unique differentiated user experiences form a composite impression on the individual which functions as an epistemic form of how we come to know and experience the world and its social, cultural, political and economic realities.     

In educational settings, social networking pedagogical approaches place social networking technologies at their core, thus presenting expansive opportunities for education to extend the curriculum beyond the traditional walls of educational institutions by reaching into the daily-lived experiences of individuals. The archival features and lack of temporal constraints associated with Internet technologies sustain continually changing currents that educators can connect to student-driven interests by engaging them with trending topics. Through social network pedagogy, educators can develop a teaching praxis where the classroom and social space blend and individuals' creative contributions are acknowledged for their cultural value.  

Jones and Huston began theorizing the development of social networking pedagogy during their tenure as doctoral students at the Indiana University School of Education where they were colleagues in the Department of Curriculum and Instruction.  They point to the fields of cultural studies and critical pedagogy, especially the contributions of David Trend with his book Cultural Pedagogy: Art, Education, Politics and the critical theorist Henry Giroux.

Philosophy of education
Social networks
Pedagogy
Critical pedagogy
Cultural studies